Ogbonna may refer to:

Angelo Ogbonna, Italian footballer
Glory Ogbonna, Nigerian footballer
Ibezito Ogbonna, Nigerian footballer
Ikechukwu Mitchel Ogbonna, professionally known as IK Ogbonna, a Nigerian film and television actor
Ogbonna John, Nigerian freestyle wrestler
Ogbonna Nwuke, Nigerian politician and newspaper publisher
Ogbonna Okechukwu Onovo, former Inspector General of the Nigerian Police
Onuoha Ogbonna, Nigerian footballer